The Wananalua Congregational Church is a historic 19th-century building on the remote coast of Maui in Hawaii.

History
Wānanalua was the name of a traditional land division (ahupuaa) on the eastern coast of the island of Maui.
The name means "double prophecy" in the Hawaiian language.
The American Board of Commissioners for Foreign Missions established a mission at the site in 1838. First residents were Daniel Toll Conde, and his wife Andelucia Lee Conde. Reverend Mark Ives (1809–1885) served at the station until 1840. In 1841 William Harrison Rice and his wife arrived, who stayed until 1844. 
In 1848 the Condes moved to the Kaahumanu Church in Wailuku, and in 1855 after the death of his wife, Conde moved to Beloit, Wisconsin. Eliphalet W. Whittlesey (1816–1889) was stationed at the church from 1844 to 1854, and William Otis Baldwin from 1855 to 1860.
Sereno Edwards Bishop (1827–1909) and his wife Cornelia A. Sessions Bishop served the station from 1855 to 1865.

When land titles were formalized in the Mahele,  were recorded as awarded to the church. 
Across the street is the Hotel Hana-Maui, originally called the Kauiki Inn.
It is named for the cinder cone Kauiki, which is the site of a rare Red Sand Beach, and a fortress from the time of ancient Hawaii where several historic battles were held. It was also the birthplace of powerful civil leader Queen Kaahumanu.

References

External links

 
 

Religious buildings and structures in Maui County, Hawaii
Churches completed in 1842
19th-century Protestant churches
Churches on the National Register of Historic Places in Hawaii
1842 establishments in Hawaii
National Register of Historic Places in Maui County, Hawaii
Congregational churches in Hawaii
Hawaii Register of Historic Places
Renaissance Revival architecture in Hawaii